Jane Williams (née Terry) (died 17 April 1845) was an Irish silversmith.

Williams was the daughter of Carden Terry; she married John Williams on 7 August 1791. Williams and Terry went into partnership together in 1795; Williams died on June 13, 1806, and left Jane with five sons and two daughters. She registered a mark of her own in Dublin in 1806, and entered into partnership with her father the following year, working in Cork. She remained active in the profession until 1821, in which year her father died. Pieces produced by the two are well-regarded for their craftsmanship.

Two pieces by Williams and Terry are in the collection of the National Museum of Women in the Arts. They are a George II marrow scoop of c. 1810 and a Regency Irish Freedom Box of 1814.

References

Year of birth missing
1845 deaths
Irish silversmiths
Women silversmiths
19th-century Irish artists
19th-century Irish women artists
People from Cork (city)